Carlos Garcia is a retired American soccer midfielder who played professionally in the USISL.

Garcia, along with his twin brother Gabe Garcia, attended the University of North Carolina at Charlotte, playing on the men’s soccer team from 1988 to 1991.

He spent the 1995 season with the Myrtle Beach Boyz.  In February 1996, D.C. United selected Garcia with the last pick (160th overall) of the 1996 MLS Inaugural Player Draft.  United released him during the pre-season and he joined the Carolina Dynamo.  In 1997, he played for both the Richmond Kickers and the Houston Hurricanes.  In 1998, he began the season with the Southwest Florida Manatees before finishing it with the Hurricanes.  He then retired and went into his family’s restaurant business.

References

Living people
American soccer players
North Carolina Fusion U23 players
Charlotte 49ers men's soccer players
Myrtle Beach Boyz players
Richmond Kickers players
Southwest Florida Manatees players
USISL players
Association football midfielders
Year of birth missing (living people)